Iorn may refer to:
Iørn Piø (1927–1998), Danish historian
Iørn Uldbjerg (born 1968), retired Danish football player

See also 
Elizabeth Iorns (born 1980), New Zealand scientist
Erin (female given name), for which "Iorn" is a rare variant
Iron (disambiguation)
Iron, a metallic chemical element
Jorn, people with the name
Yorn, people with the name